Francis Andrews may refer to:

Francis Andrews (1718–1774), Irish politician
Sir Francis Andrews, 4th Baronet of the Andrews baronets
Francis Andrews (settler), see History of Hartford, Connecticut
Francis Andrews, character in the novel The Man Within

See also
Frank Andrews (disambiguation)